Honda Small Hybrid Sports Concept is a hybrid concept car developed by Honda. The premiere of the concept car took place at the Geneva Motor Show in 2007. The car was designed by the European branch of Honda, based in Offenbach am Main, to combine the idea of a sports car, efficient and ecological.

The car has a front-wheel drive powered by a 4-cylinder petrol-electric engine with a CVT transmission. The car's suspension was mounted on 20-inch rims with 165/60 tires.

References

Small Hybrid Sports Concept
Cars introduced in 2007